Bobby Lohse (born 3 February 1958) is a Swedish sailor. He won a silver medal in the Star class at the 1996 Summer Olympics with Hans Wallén.

References
 

1958 births
Living people
Swedish male sailors (sport)
Olympic sailors of Sweden
Sailors at the 1992 Summer Olympics – Star
Sailors at the 1996 Summer Olympics – Star
Olympic silver medalists for Sweden
Olympic medalists in sailing

Medalists at the 1996 Summer Olympics